Stripper was a type of harvesting machine common in Australia in the late 19th and early 20th century. John Ridley is now accepted as its inventor, though John Wrathall Bull argued strongly for the credit.

Description
The stripper plucks the ears of grain (generally wheat) without winnowing, and leaving the straw standing. The first strippers were drawn by bullocks and consisted of a large, wheeled,  box-like machine with a row of spiked prongs in front and with a long pole at the back of the machine for steering. It had the advantage over the early reaper machines in being able to reap more quickly (of benefit in a hot climate) and having fewer components subject to wearing out.

The first strippers were improved by adding a beater to knock the heads off the stems. The machines became headers. Later headers had reciprocating cutter bars at the back of the combs to cut the stems just short of the heads.

A stripper-harvester also winnowed the grain, removing the chaff.

Notable manufacturers were Sunshine Harvester, J. and D. Shearer and Mellor Bros. (who specialised in "bike strippers", ie. light enough to be drawn by a bicycle).

Evolution of the header

The Gallic reaper  that is seen in Roman times, in the first three centuries of the current era led to the stripper developed in the 19th century. The Gallic reaper had a comb at the front to collect grain heads. An operator would knock the heads into a tray for collection. The stripper developed in South Australia used the principles, with a comb at the front, using a mechanical beater to knock the heads off. Later innovations were including a cutter bar similar to the binder reaper and an elevator to lift the heads into a storage bin for later threshing. The combined header-harvester added the winnower to thresh the grain from the heads.

Sources
The Australian National Dictionary Oxford University Press 1988

References 

Agricultural machinery